Sayler is a surname. Notable people with the surname include:

Henry B. Sayler (1836–1900), American politician, cousin of Milton
Jace Sayler (born 1979), American football player
Milton Sayler (1831–1892), American politician

See also
Battle of Sayler's Creek, fought April 6, 1865, southwest of Petersburg, Virginia
Sayler Park, Cincinnati, neighborhood in Cincinnati, Ohio
Sayler's Creek Battlefield near Farmville, Virginia